Boyd Lavell Eddins (born August 4, 1933) was an American politician in the state of Wyoming. He served in the Wyoming State Senate as a member of the Republican Party.

He served as President of the Wyoming Senate from 1995 to 1997. He attended Weber State University and the University of Utah and was a rancher.

References

1933 births
Living people
Presidents of the Wyoming Senate
Republican Party Wyoming state senators
Weber State University alumni
University of Utah alumni
Ranchers from Wyoming
People from Lincoln County, Wyoming